Rothes Football Club is a senior football club who play in the Highland Football League. They were originally founded in 1907 as a Junior club, Rothes Victoria, and turned Senior on 4 May 1938 as Rothes FC, obtaining a place in the Highland League. They play at Mackessack Park in Rothes, a small town near Elgin in Moray. They play in tangerine shirts, colours they inherited from Dundee United after purchasing the floodlights from Tannadice Park. Rothes have won the Highland League once, in the 1958–59 season. Mackessack Park is named after one Douglas Mackessack, a local laird and whisky magnate and an early benefactor of the club.

In 2020, The Speysiders won their first honours in 41 years, defeating Buckie Thistle 2–1 in the Highland League Cup final to win the trophy for the first time.

Management
Manager: Ross Jack
Assistant Manager: Jim Walker

Club honours
Highland Football League
1958–59

Highland League Cup
2019–20

North of Scotland Cup
1958–59, 1978–79, 2021–22

Campbell Charity Cup
1949–50

References

External links

 
Football clubs in Scotland
Highland Football League teams
Association football clubs established in 1938
1938 establishments in Scotland
Football in Moray
Rothes